Galatasaray TV (GSTV) is a channel of Turkish company Galatasaray S.K. The daily programs of this TV include live games (basketball, volleyball, water polo, equestrian, youth football teams, rowing and sailing) and learning cultural roots of Galatasaray (Galatasaray Lycée—Galatasaray Lisesi, Galatasaray Université—Galatasaray Üniversitesi, history of Galatasaray).

The channel first launched in January 2006 over satellite, now digital cable services are activated.

Live transmissions
Galatasaray TV has a studio at Galatasaray's Türk Telekom Arena. Live transmissions happen on a weekly basis in the form of Matchnight Live and Live From Türk Telekom Arena. On 17 August 2010, GSTV announced that 3G Live Programs started.  Fans are welcome to telephone into these shows for phone-in discussions. Also, most of the games played by clubs basketball and volleyball teams broadcast live.

Content
The channel features:

Replays of every Galatasaray SK match in all competitions, including post match coverage & analysis
Exclusive interviews with staff and players
Live news program
Pre-match coverage of all Galatasaray games
Live coverage of Galatasaray Reserves and first-team friendly matches
Highlights of Galatasaray Football Academy and Galatasaray Basketball and Volleyball matches
Galatasaray-related news
Highlights of classic matches
Documentaries based on the club's history

Programs in Turkish

Commentators/Presenters

Other Galatasaray media 

As with other sports clubs, Galatasaray have their own media outlets to communicate official news and information to their supporters. These include:

Club magazine, Galatasaray Magazine
The Official Galatasaray Website]
Digital TV Channel, Galatasaray TV
Cellular service provider, Galatasaray Mobile
Galatasaray TV Online Website GSTV Online

References

External links
Official Galatasaray Website

Galatasaray S.K.
Television stations in Turkey
Turkish-language television stations
Sports television networks
Sports television in Turkey
Television channels and stations established in 2006
2006 establishments in Turkey
Mass media in Istanbul